Theo Germaine is an American actor, best known for playing James Sullivan on the Netflix television series The Politician.

Personal life
Germaine is originally from Illinois; they worked at a coffee shop in Chicago before temporarily relocating to Los Angeles, California for The Politician. Germaine is non-binary and uses they/them pronouns. On the LGBTQ&A podcast, Germaine explained, "I joke and tell people my first memories are The Lion King and gender dysphoria. I remember being three years old and being in daycare and we were all lying down on our mats and trying to nap, and I remember not being able to nap because I would always just sit there and think about gender." Germaine transitioned as a teen.

Filmography

Television

Film

References

External links
 Theo Germaine at IMDb

Year of birth missing (living people)
Living people
Actors from Illinois
American television actors
LGBT people from Illinois
American non-binary actors
People from Chicago
People from Murphysboro, Illinois
Transgender non-binary people
University of Illinois Urbana-Champaign alumni